The "Join the Joyride! World Tour" was the third concert tour by Swedish pop duo Roxette. Their first tour to incorporate dates outside of Scandinavia, it was launched in support of their third studio album, Joyride (1991), and saw the band playing a total of 100 shows throughout Europe, Australia and the Americas. Canadian rock band Glass Tiger supported Roxette on all European dates, while support on the Canadian and US dates was provided by fellow Canadian pop groups World on Edge and West End Girls.

Reception
The tour was originally scheduled to begin in North America, although Per Gessle later explained: "We were supposed to start the tour in America, but then everything got sort of screwed up because of the gulf crisis. So we started in Europe, and then the whole album just exploded [there]. So we kept on doing that forever." Opening instead in September in Helsinki, the tour saw the band playing to over 1.7 million people during its 100 shows in Europe, Australia and North and South America. Tickets for the tour's Swedish dates sold out within a week of release, with the band performing to 104,200 people there over those fifteen dates. The South American leg of the tour was particularly successful. Beginning on 25 March 1992 in Mexico City, the thirteen dates saw the band performing to a total of 347,000 audience members in Mexico, Uruguay, Paraguay, Chile, Argentina and Brazil, with ticket prices across the tour averaging roughly US$20. They played four shows in both Argentina and Brazil, with total ticket sales in those countries exceeding 120,000 and 110,000, respectively. By the end of the tour, sales of Look Sharp! and Joyride in those six territories had risen to almost 1.1 million copies, up 27% from pre-tour sales figures.

The North American leg of the tour received mixed reviews. A review for the Los Angeles Times claimed that Fredriksson was "squandering her talents in pop's low-rent district. She's clearly superior to Roxette's uncomplicated, hook-crammed material"; Jon Pareles of The New York Times criticized their show for its "careful mimicry of MTV. On a set painted in Piet Mondrian primary colors, Miss Fredriksson struts, leans on the other band members, makes symmetrical arm motions, pouts and straps on a guitar to take a few chords; she took off her leather jacket and later her long sleeves, like a G-rated stripper."

Recordings
On 21 August 1992, Roxette released a live video entitled Live-Ism. It contained a shortened version (twelve songs) of their set from their 13 December 1991 performance at the Sydney Entertainment Centre, as well as music videos for "Church of Your Heart", "(Do You Get) Excited?" and then-current single "How Do You Do!". The latter was the first single taken from the duo's fourth studio album, Tourism, which was released a week after the video. Tourism: Songs from Studios, Stages, Hotelrooms, and Other Strange Places was described by Roxette as a "tour album", and consisted of songs recorded by the band in various locations during the "Join the Joyride! Tour", including live versions of "The Look" and "Joyride" taken from the aforementioned Sydney concert, along with live versions of "It Must Have Been Love" from their 25 April 1992 concert in Santiago, Chile and "Things Will Never Be the Same" from a November 1991 concert in Zürich.

Set list
This set list is representative of the tour's opening show on 4 September 1991 in Helsinki, Finland. It does not represent all dates throughout the tour.

 "Hotblooded"
 "Dangerous"
 "Fading Like a Flower (Every Time You Leave)"
 "Church of Your Heart"
 "Sleeping Single"
 "Spending My Time"
 "Watercolours in the Rain"
 "Paint"
 "Knockin' on Every Door"
 "Dance Away"
 "The Big L."
 "Things Will Never Be the Same"
 "It Must Have Been Love"
 "Dressed for Success"
 "Soul Deep"
 "The Look"
 "(Do You Get) Excited?"
 "Joyride"
 "Listen To Your Heart"
 "Perfect Day"

"Join the Summer Joyride!" Tour
This set list is derived from the show on 28 June 1992 at the Brabanthallen in Den Bosch, The Netherlands. It can be considered representative of the entire tour, as the same set was performed on every date.

 "Hotblooded"
 "Dangerous"
 "Fading Like a Flower (Every Time You Leave)"
 "Church of Your Heart"
 "Sleeping Single"
 "Spending My Time"
 "The Heart Shaped Sea"
 "Cry"
 "Knockin' on Every Door"
 "The Big L."
 "Things Will Never Be the Same"
 "It Must Have Been Love"
 "Dressed for Success"
 "The Look"
 "How Do You Do!"
 "(Do You Get) Excited?"
 "Joyride"
 "Perfect Day"
 "Listen To Your Heart"

Tour dates

Cancelled shows

Lineup
 Marie Fredriksson — vocals, backing vocals, electric guitar, piano
 Per Gessle — vocals, backing vocals, rhythm guitar
 Per "Pelle" Alsing — drums, percussion
 Vicki Benckert — backing vocals, accordion, mandolin, electric guitar
 Anders Herrlin — bass
 Jonas Isacsson — electric guitar
 Clarence Öfwerman — keyboards
 Staffan Öfwerman — backing vocals, keyboards, percussion

References

Roxette concert tours
1991 concert tours
1992 concert tours